Pristimantis aurantiguttatus is a species of frog in the family Strabomantidae.
It is endemic to Colombia.
Its natural habitat is tropical moist montane forests.

References

aurantiguttatus
Amphibians of Colombia
Endemic fauna of Colombia
Amphibians described in 1997
Taxonomy articles created by Polbot